Strmec pri Ormožu is a small settlement in the hills immediately northwest of Ormož in northeastern Slovenia. The area belongs to the traditional region of Styria. It is now included in the Drava Statistical Region.

References

External links
Strmec pri Ormožu on Geopedia

Populated places in the Municipality of Ormož